Jacques Nahum (27 February 1921 – 21 July 2017) was a French director, screenwriter, and producer, famed for producing the cult television show Arsène Lupin, descended from the Pallache family.

Background

Jacques Nahum was born on February 27, 1921, in Cairo, Egypt.

His Sephardic Jewish parents were Joab Nahum of Izmir, Turkey, and Fortunée Palacci of Cairo, Egypt; he had one brother, Robert (1925–1973).

Nahum arrived in Paris at the age of 24 and in 1945 began to study at the Institut des hautes études cinématographiques (IDHEC, since 1988 La Fémis).

Career

Film

By the late 1940s, Nahum was an assistant director.

John Berry

In the 1950s, Nahum was first assistant director to American film director John Berry.

Berry went to France to escape the impact of the Hollywood Blacklist.  Early in 1950, his documentary The Hollywood Ten was released; thereafter, fellow director Edward Dmytryk denounced him as a communist.  After two movies in 1951–1952, Berry hit a dry spell.  French film distributor David Medioni hired him for French-distributed movies on a low salary plus percentage in the films.  Nahum later explained:  "Here was this small-time producer [Medioni].  He knew that John [Berry] had made great films in Hollywood, and thought it would be quite a coup if he could get this big Hollywood director, who had worked with John Garfield, to work on his little B-movie."  Berry did not have to have a director's permit under French law and union rules at that time.

For Berry's first film in France, Ça va barder (1955), Nahum's job started as assembling crew .  While shooting, Berry, Nahum, and Nahum's friend Jacques-Laurent Bost, modified the story of the first film considerably.

For Tamango (1957), Berry could not find Black actors, so Nahum helped him hire French soldiers from French African colonies.  The French soldiers disliked the make-up intensely or anything else that made them feel like African slaves, according to Nahum.

Television

In 1960, he founded his own production company, Mars International Productions.  From 1962 to 1980, he directed 400 commercials.

In 1961, the film Une aussi longue absence, directed by Henri Colpi and co-scripted by Marguerite Duras, for which he was executive producer, shared the Palme d'or at the Cannes Film Festival.  In the early 1960s, he directed the film Le Saint mène la danse, which starred Michèle Mercier.

In the 1970s, he turned toward television production, where he would stay for the remainder of his live.  Best known among his television works are: Arsène Lupine (1971) starring Georges Descrières, Le Cheval de coeur (1995) starring Guillaume Canet, and Marcel Pagnol's trilogy Marius, Fanny, and César (2000) starring Roger Hanin.  His last production was Le chapeau de Mitterrand (2014).

Personal life and death

Nahum married Odette Pinto. They had one child, Alain Nahum, also a film director as well as photographer.

Nahum died on July 21, 2017, in Paris, France.

Legacy

Dominique Ambiel, often a co-producer, called him:

"Pionnier dans la production de séries télévisées populaires, il est aussi l'un des premiers à mener des coproductions internationales d'envergure et à initier des films patrimoniaux et de grande qualité pour la télévision. (Pioneer in the production of popular television series, he is also one of the first to carry out major international co-productions and to initiate high-quality films for television.)"

Awards
 Palme d'or (1961)
 Chevalier dans l'Ordre national du Mérite

Filmography

Nahum's major works span a half century.

Producer
 1961: Une aussi longue absence
 1971: Arsène Lupin (TV series)
 1977:  Bilitis 
 1980: Sam et Sally 
 1982: Salut, j'arrive
 1983: L'Art d'aimer
 1986: Le Tiroir secret (TV series)
 1990: Le retour d'Arsène Lupin (TV series)
 1995: Le Cheval de Cœur
 1997: L'enfant Perdu de Christian Faure
 1998: À nous deux la vie
 1999: La Femme du boulanger
 2000: La Trilogie Marseillaise - Marius, Fanny, César
 2002 - 2003: Action Justice (TV series)
 2004: Le Président Ferrare (TV series)
 2007: Le temps des secrets - Le temps des amours
 2009: Des gens qui passent
 2012: La Chartreuse de Parme
 2014: Le Chapeau de Mitterrand

Director
 1954: Face of Paris episode "Your favorite story" 
 1960: Le Saint mène la danse (AKA Le Saint conduit le bal)
 1967: Yves Robert un chemin de la liberté
 1971: Madame Simone (also writer)
 1973: Le Double Assassinat de la rue Morgue
 1974: Eugène Sue (film)
 1975: Maître Pygmalion
 1975: Les Grands Détectives episode "Six hommes morts"

Second Unit Director or Assistant Director
 1955: Ça va barder by John Berry
 1955: Je suis un sentimental by John Berry
 1956: Don Juan by John Berry
 1958: Tamango by John Berry

Writer
 1952:  The Face of Paris (co-writer)
 2012: La Chartreuse de Parme by Cinzia TH Torrini (co-writer)

See also
 Pallache family

References

External sources
 
 Le Film Français
 Mubi
 Allocine
 UniFrance
 Premiere
 Sens Critique
 British Film Institute (BFI)
 Bibliotèque nationale de France
 Getty Photos
 Photo 1966 with Brigitte Bardot
 10 films liés à Jacques Nahum

1921 births
2017 deaths
French directors
French screenwriters
French producers
Film people from Cairo
Palme d'Or winners
French people of Egyptian-Jewish descent
Knights of the Ordre national du Mérite
Film directors from Paris
Egyptian emigrants to France
French people of Turkish-Jewish descent
Egyptian people of Turkish-Jewish descent